Capt. William Ramsay Hutchison (16 January 1889 – 22 March 1918) was a Scottish international rugby union player. He was killed in World War I.

He played for Glasgow District in the inter-city match against Edinburgh District on 3 March 1910.

He is remembered on the Arras memorial bay 5.

References

External links
 "An entire team wiped out by the Great War".  The Scotsman, 6 November 2009

1889 births
1918 deaths
Scottish rugby union players
Scotland international rugby union players
British military personnel killed in World War I
Royal Scots Fusiliers officers
Glasgow HSFP players
Glasgow District (rugby union) players
Rugby union players from Glasgow
Rugby union locks